Three Strong Women is a 2009 novel by the French writer Marie NDiaye. It won the 2009 Prix Goncourt, France's most prestigious literary award. The English translation by John Fletcher was published in April 2012 in the UK by MacLehose Press, and in August 2012 by Knopf in the USA.

According to the description by Maya Jaggi in The Guardian: "Moving mainly between France and Senegal, this novel explores survival, inheritance and the feared repetition of history – within families, as between peoples. Its three heroines have an unassailable sense of their own self-worth, while their psychological battles have an almost mythic resonance."

Summary

The novel is composed of three accounts and is a history of three women, Norah, Fanta and Khady, who reject humiliation and embrace life. The unifying theme is that they are  threatened or abandoned by men.

The first story is inspired in part by Ndiaye's own life, and is built around the departure of a Senegalese father from France, taking with him his only son Sony, and abandoning his wife and daughters (Ndiaye's Senegalese father left when she was a year old, in a similar way). One daughter, Norah, now married and with children of her own, is working as a lawyer in Paris. She is summoned to Dakar by her absent father, supposedly a successful businessman. On arrival, she discovers her brother Sony is in prison for the alleged murder of his stepmother, and the father — whom she still fears and dislikes — wants her to defend him in court. He is now broke. Sony then alleges from prison that his father was actually the murderer, leaving Norah to challenge her father...but the account ends there.

The second story takes place in the Gironde in France (where Marie Ndiaye actually owns a house), where Fanta, a teacher, and her academic husband Rudy have a serious argument, and he shouts "go back where you came from". This racist remark has repercussions for their relationship. An earlier racist incident in their lives, which led to them fleeing Senegal where he had been teaching in the International School, is revealed. The theme is of patriarchal control, and a life unravelling — as in the first story, control over children is an issue.

The third part returns to a maid, Khady Demba, working in Norah's father's house in Dakar. Despite getting "a minuscule helping of the good things in life" she is nourished by determination, and memories of a caring grandmother. Khady is later widowed and abandoned, and arrives in France after an arduous journey as a traumatized, clandestine migrant. She knows only Fanta, a distant cousin. The weak man in this tale is a lover who abandons her.

Awards and honours
2009 Prix Goncourt, winner.
2014 International Dublin Literary Award, one of eight finalists, for the English translation.

See also
 2009 in literature
 Contemporary French literature

References

External links
 Maya Jaggi, "Three Strong Women by Marie NDiaye – review", The Guardian, 6 July 2012.
 Fernanda Eberstadt, "Hopes Spring Eternal - ‘Three Strong Women,’ by Marie NDiaye" (review), The New York Times, 10 August 2012.
 Jessa Crispin, "Marie NDiaye: 'Three Strong Women'" (review), in Kirkus, 4 September 2012.

2009 French novels
Prix Goncourt winning works
Éditions Gallimard books
Novels by Marie NDiaye
MacLehose Press books